
The list of torpedoes by name includes all torpedoes operated in the past or present.

See also 
 List of lists of weapons

Notes

References
 Boyne, Walter J. Clash of Titans. (1995) Simon and Schuster, NY, NY. .
 Morison, Samuel Eliot. History of United States Naval Operations in World War Two. 1984 edition, Volume 3. Little, Brown, and Company.
 
 "Torpedo History" Geoff Kirby (1972)

Torpedoes by name